The Return of the Dead Army is a 1989 Albanian  film directed by Dhimitër Anagnosti based on the acclaimed novel The General of the Dead Army by Albanian author Ismail Kadare.

Plot
At the end of the World War II Italian Colonel Z accompanied by a priest comes back to Albania to search for the General's bones who died during the war.

Cast
Kastriot Ahmetaj	
Roza Anagnosti	
Rajmonda Bullku	
Vasillaq Godo	
Bujar Lako	
Gulielm Radoja	
Liza Vorfi	
Ndriçim Xhepa

Other films based on the book
The General of the Dead Army (Italian: Il generale dell'armata morta) is a 1983 Italian film starring Michel Piccoli, based on the novel, directed by Luciano Tovoli.
Life and Nothing But (La Vie et rien d’autre) is a 1989 French film starring Philippe Noiret, based on the novel, directed by Bertrand Tavernier.

References

External links
 

1989 films
1989 drama films
Albanian drama films
Albanian-language films
1980s black comedy films
1989 comedy films
Films based on Albanian novels
Films based on historical novels